The 1986 Currie Cup was the 48th edition of the Currie Cup, the premier annual domestic rugby union competition in South Africa.

Teams

The following teams took part in the 1986 Currie Cup:

Fixtures and Results

All result source:

Round One

Round Two

Round Three

Round Four

Round Five

Round Six

Round Seven

Round Eight

Round Nine

Round Ten

Grand Final

See also

 Currie Cup

References

1986
1986 in South African rugby union
1986 rugby union tournaments for clubs